Daphne  (Greek: Δάφνη "laurel") is a genus of between 70 and 95 species of deciduous and evergreen shrubs in the family Thymelaeaceae, native to Asia, Europe and north Africa. They are noted for their scented flowers and often brightly coloured berries. Two species are used to make paper. Many species are grown in gardens as ornamental plants; the smaller species are often used in rock gardens. All parts of daphnes are poisonous, especially the berries.

Description
Daphne species are shrubs, with upright or prostrate stems. Their leaves are undivided, mostly arranged alternately (although opposite in D. genkwa), and have short petioles (stalks). The leaves tend to be clustered towards the end of the stems and are of different shapes, although always longer than wide. The leaf surface may be smooth (glabrous) or hairy.

Many species flower in late winter or very early spring.  The flowers are grouped into clusters (inflorescences), either in the leaf axils towards the end of the stems or forming terminal heads. The inflorescences lack bracts. Individual flowers completely lack petals and are formed by four (rarely five) petaloid sepals, tubular at the base with free lobes at the apex. They range in colour from white, greenish yellow or yellow to bright pink and purple. Most of the evergreen species have greenish flowers, while the deciduous species tend to have pink flowers. There are twice the number of stamens as sepals, usually eight, arranged in two series. Stamens either have short filaments or lack filaments altogether and are usually held inside the sepal tube. The style is short or absent, and the stigma is head-shaped (capitate).

The ovary has a single chamber (locule). The fruits are one-seeded, and are either fleshy berries or dry and leathery (drupaceous). When ripe the fruit is usually red or yellow, sometimes black.

Taxonomy
The genus Daphne was first described by Carl Linnaeus in 1753 in Species Plantarum. Linnaeus recognized 10 species, including Daphne mezereum, Daphne laureola and Daphne cneorum. Some of his species are now placed in other related genera (e.g. Linnaeus's Daphne thymelaea is now Thymelaea sanamunda). The number of species in the genus varies considerably between different authorities. The Flora of China states there are about 95 species, 41 of which are endemic to China. Some of these species were reduced to subspecies or varieties by Josef Halda in a series of papers from 1997 onwards, culminating in a monograph on the genus. Version 1.1 of The Plant List accepts 83 species. The Flora of North America states there are 70 species.

Phylogeny and generic limits
A 2002 study based on chloroplast DNA placed Daphne in a group of related genera; however there was only one species representing each genus.

A further study published in 2009 included an extra species of Wikstroemia and suggested that this genus was paraphyletic with respect to Stellera, but otherwise agreed with the cladogram above. The distinction between Wikstroemia and Daphne is difficult to make; Halda included Wikstroemia within Daphne. The cladogram shown above suggests that other genera would need to be included as well to make Daphne monophyletic.

Species
, Plants of the World Online accepts the following species:

Daphne acutiloba Rehder
Daphne alpina L.
Daphne altaica Pall.
Daphne angustiloba Rehder
Daphne arbuscula Čelak.
Daphne arisanensis Hayata
Daphne aurantiaca Diels
Daphne axillaris (Merr. & Chun) Chun & C.F.Wei
Daphne axilliflora (Keissl.) Pobed.
Daphne baksanica Pobed.
Daphne bholua Buch.-Ham. ex D.Don
Daphne blagayana Freyer
Daphne brevituba H.F.Zhou ex C.Y.Chang
Daphne caucasica Pall.
Daphne championii Benth.
Daphne chingshuishaniana S.S.Ying
Daphne cneorum L.
Daphne depauperata H.F.Zhou ex C.Y.Chang
Daphne domini Halda
Daphne emeiensis C.Y.Chang
Daphne erosiloba C.Y.Chang
Daphne esquirolii H.Lév.
Daphne feddei H.Lév.
Daphne gaomushanensis Zi L.Chen, P.Wang & Y.F.Lu
Daphne gemmata E.Pritz.
Daphne genkwa Siebold & Zucc.
Daphne giraldii Nitsche
Daphne glomerata Lam.
Daphne gnidioides Jaub. & Spach
Daphne gnidium L.
Daphne gracilis E.Pritz.
Daphne grueningiana H.J.P.Winkl.
Daphne hekouensis H.W.Li & Y.M.Shui
Daphne holosericea (Diels) Hamaya
Daphne jarmilae Halda
Daphne jasminea Sm.
Daphne jejudoensis M.Kim
Daphne jezoensis Maxim.
Daphne jinyunensis C.Yung Chang
Daphne jinzhaiensis D.C.Zhang & J.Z.Shao
Daphne kamtschatica Maxim.
Daphne kingdon-wardii Halda
Daphne kiusiana Miq.
Daphne kosaninii (Stoj.) Stoj.
Daphne kurdica (Bornm.) Bornm.
Daphne laciniata Lecomte
Daphne laureola L.
Daphne leishanensis H.F.Zhou ex C.Y.Chang
Daphne limprichtii H.J.P.Winkl.
Daphne longilobata (Lecomte) Turrill
Daphne longituba C.Yung Chang
Daphne ludlowii D.G.Long & Rae
Daphne luzonica C.B.Rob.
Daphne macrantha Ludlow
Daphne malyana Blečić
Daphne mezereum L.
Daphne miyabeana Makino
Daphne modesta Rehder
Daphne morrisonensis C.E.Chang
Daphne mucronata Royle
Daphne myrtilloides Nitsche
Daphne nana Tagawa
Daphne odora Thunb.
Daphne ogisui C.D.Brickell, B.Mathew & Yin Z.Wang
Daphne oleoides Schreb.
Daphne pachyphylla D.Fang
Daphne papyracea Wall. ex G.Don
Daphne pedunculata H.F.Zhou ex C.Y.Chang
Daphne penicillata Rehder
Daphne petraea Leyb.
Daphne pontica L.
Daphne pseudomezereum A.Gray
Daphne pseudosericea Pobed.
Daphne purpurascens S.C.Huang
Daphne retusa Hemsl.
Daphne rhynchocarpa C.Y.Chang
Daphne rodriguezii Texidor
Daphne rosmarinifolia Rehder
Daphne sericea Vahl
Daphne sojakii Halda
Daphne sophia Kolenicz.
Daphne souliei (Lecomte) Aymonin
Daphne stapfii Bornm. & Keissl.
Daphne striata Tratt.
Daphne sureil W.W.Sm. & Cave
Daphne tangutica Maxim.
Daphne taurica Kotov
Daphne taylorii Halda
Daphne tenuiflora Bureau & Franch.
Daphne thanguensis J.Ghosh, Midday, S.K.Dey & D.Maity
Daphne transcaucasica Pobed.
Daphne tripartita H.F.Zhou ex C.Y.Chang
Daphne velenovskyi Halda
Daphne wangiana (Hamaya) Halda
Daphne wolongensis C.D.Brickell & B.Mathew
Daphne xichouensis H.F.Zhou ex C.Y.Chang
Daphne yunnanensis H.F.Zhou ex C.Y.Chang

Hybrids
Hybrids accepted by Plants of the World Online are:

Daphne × hauseri Halda
Daphne × hendersonii Hodgkin ex C.D.Brickell & B.Mathew – natural hybrid D. petraea × D. cneorum
Daphne × houtteana Lindl. & Paxton
Daphne × juraseki Halda
Daphne × neapolitana (Lindl.) Loudon
Daphne × rossetii H.Correvon & Halda
Daphne × savensis Daksk., Seliškar & Vreš
Daphne × sillingeri Halda
Daphne × thauma Farrer – natural hybrid D. petraea × D. striata

Numerous artificial hybrids are cultivated as ornamental plants. These include:
D. × burkwoodii – D. cneorum × D. caucasica
D. × napolitana Lodd. has gained the Royal Horticultural Society's Award of Garden Merit – origin not known
D. × susannae C.D.Brickell – artificial hybrid D. arbuscula × D. sericea (syn. D. collina); the correct name may be D. × medfordensis Halda
D. × schlyteri – artificial hybrid D. cneorum × D. arbuscula

Distribution
Daphne is a Eurasian genus, being native to central and southern Europe and Asia, from Britain to Japan. Some species are also found in north Africa. Two species, D. mezereum and D. laureola, have been introduced into North America.

Uses
Two species, Daphne bholua and Daphne papyracea, both called lokta, are sustainably harvested in Nepal and Bhutan for paper production.

Many species are cultivated as ornamental shrubs in gardens. The smaller species are used as rock garden plants or, in the case of those more difficult to grow, as plants for the alpine house. It is recommended that they are grown in well drained but moisture-retentive soil, avoiding strongly acid conditions. Most species prefer a sunny position, although some are woodland plants (e.g. D. mezereum and D. pontica). Propagation is by seed, cuttings or layering.

Award of garden merit
The following species, hybrids and cultivars are recipients of the Royal Horticultural Society's Award of Garden Merit:
 
Daphne arbuscula 
Daphne bholua 'Jacqueline Postill'  
Daphne bholua var. glacialis 'Gurkha'  
Daphne × burkwoodii 'Somerset'  
Daphne cneorum 'Eximia'  
Daphne × rollsdorfii 'Wilhelm Schacht'  
Daphne tangutica Retusa Group  
Daphne × transatlantica  = 'Blafra' PBR

Toxicity
All parts of daphnes are toxic, the berries being particularly so. One active compound is daphnin, a glycoside, combining glucose with daphnetin. Some species have been shown to contain a further toxin, mezerein. Symptoms of ingestion include burning sensations and lesions of the mouth and upper digestive tract, gastroenteritis and diarrhoea, and in severe cases, damage to the kidneys (nephritis), irregular heart rhythm, and coma.

Allergenicity

Daphnes have an OPALS allergy scale rating of 5 out of 10, indicating moderate potential to cause allergic reactions, exacerbated by over-use of the same plant throughout a garden. The sap and berry juice can cause dermatitis and the scent may affect the odor-sensitive.

Gallery

References

Bibliography

External links 

 Flora Europaea: Daphne

 
Malvales genera
Medicinal plants
Poisonous plants